Minthostachys mollis is a medicinal plant restricted to the South American Andes from Peru Venezuela to Bolivia. It is the most variable and widely distributed species of the genus Minthostachys. It is known by the common names muña, tipo, tipollo, or poleo.

Medicinal uses
In the indigenous medicine traditions of the Andes, the plant is made into tea and used medicinally as a carminative and aphrodisiac.

Etymology
Its common name "muña" comes from Quechua.

Chemical characteristics
The principal components of essential oil are as follows:
pulegone
menthone
menthol
(−)-β-pinene
(−)-α-pinene
limonene
isomenthone
piperic acid
eucalyptol
carvone

In the flowering tops 19 compounds were identified in the essential oil, predominantly 29% neomenthol, 24% menthone, 20% menthol, and 8% piperitone.

References

External links

Lamiaceae
Flora of Ecuador
Medicinal plants of South America